Bioacoustics is a cross-disciplinary science that combines biology and acoustics. Usually it refers to the investigation of sound production, dispersion and reception in animals (including humans). This involves neurophysiological and anatomical basis of sound production and detection, and relation of acoustic signals to the medium they disperse through. The findings provide clues about the evolution of acoustic mechanisms, and from that, the evolution of animals that employ them.

In underwater acoustics and fisheries acoustics the term is also used to mean the effect of plants and animals on sound propagated underwater, usually in reference to the use of sonar technology for biomass estimation. The study of substrate-borne vibrations used by animals is considered by some a distinct field called biotremology.

History
For a long time humans have employed animal sounds to recognise and find them. Bioacoustics as a scientific discipline was established by the Slovene biologist Ivan Regen who began systematically to study insect sounds. In 1925 he used a special stridulatory device to play in a duet with an insect. Later, he put a male cricket behind a microphone and female crickets in front of a loudspeaker. The females were not moving towards the male but towards the loudspeaker. Regen's most important contribution to the field apart from realization that insects also detect airborne sounds was the discovery of tympanal organ's function.

Relatively crude electro-mechanical devices available at the time (such as phonographs) allowed only for crude appraisal of signal properties. More accurate measurements were made possible in the second half of the 20th century by advances in electronics and utilization of devices such as oscilloscopes and digital recorders.

The most recent advances in bioacoustics concern the relationships among the animals and their acoustic environment and the impact of anthropogenic noise. Bioacoustic techniques have recently been proposed as a non-destructive method for estimating biodiversity of an area.

Importance 
As humans are considered as visual animals, hence, vision holds a primary distance sense since light propagates very well in the terrestrial environment. Meanwhile, in the underwater environment light can only propagate to some tens of meters which is why, light doesn't play a better role to explore marine environment. On the other hand the propagation of sound under the sea is commendable which motivates oceanographers choose sound for underwater communication. Therefore, it is clear that marine animals can see well but emphasize hearing just as opposite to humans who can hear well but emphasize vision. Gauging relative importance of audition versus vision in animals can be performed just by the comparison of number of auditory and optic nerves. 

Marine animals have been termed to be very vocal animals. In the period of 1950s to 1960s, study on dolphin's echolocating behavior using high frequency click sounds have been investigated vigorously along with studies associating with different other sounds produced by different other marine mammal species and henceforth identifying the sounds associated with different species under water. Most of the researches in bioacoustic field have been funded by naval research organizations as biological noise sources can interfere with military use of sound in the sea.

Methods

Listening is still one of the main methods used in bioacoustical research. Little is known about neurophysiological processes that play a role in production, detection and interpretation of sounds in animals, so animal behaviour and the signals themselves are used for gaining insight into these processes.

Acoustic signals

An experienced observer can use animal sounds to recognize a "singing" animal species, its location and condition in nature. Investigation of animal sounds also includes signal recording with electronic recording equipment. Due to the wide range of signal properties and media they propagate through, specialized equipment may be required instead of the usual microphone, such as a hydrophone (for underwater sounds), detectors of ultrasound (very high-frequency sounds) or infrasound (very low-frequency sounds), or a laser vibrometer (substrate-borne vibrational signals). Computers are used for storing and analysis of recorded sounds. Specialized sound-editing software is used for describing and sorting signals according to their intensity, frequency, duration and other parameters.

Animal sound collections, managed by museums of natural history and other institutions, are an important tool for systematic investigation of signals. Many effective automated methods involving signal processing, data mining and machine learning techniques have been developed to detect and classify the bioacoustic signals.

Sound production, detection, and use in animals
Scientists in the field of bioacoustics are interested in anatomy and neurophysiology of organs involved in sound production and detection, including their shape, muscle action, and activity of neuronal networks involved. Of special interest is coding of signals with action potentials in the latter.

But since the methods used for neurophysiological research are still fairly complex and understanding of relevant processes is incomplete, more trivial methods are also used. Especially useful is observation of behavioural responses to acoustic signals. One such response is phonotaxis – directional movement towards the signal source. By observing response to well defined signals in a controlled environment, we can gain insight into signal function, sensitivity of the hearing apparatus, noise filtering capability, etc.

Biomass estimation

Biomass estimation is a method of detecting and quantifying fish and other marine organisms using sonar technology. As the sound pulse travels through water it encounters objects that are of different density than the surrounding medium, such as fish, that reflect sound back toward the sound source. These echoes provide information on fish size, location, and abundance. The basic components of the scientific echo sounder hardware function is to transmit the sound, receive, filter and amplify, record, and analyze the echoes. While there are many manufacturers of commercially available "fish-finders," quantitative analysis requires that measurements be made with calibrated echo sounder equipment, having high signal-to-noise ratios.

Animal sounds

Sounds used by animals that fall within the scope of bioacoustics include a wide range of frequencies and media, and are often not "sound" in the narrow sense of the word (i.e. compression waves that propagate through air and are detectable by the human ear). Katydid crickets, for example, communicate by sounds with frequencies higher than 100 kHz, far into the ultrasound range. Lower, but still in ultrasound, are sounds used by bats for echolocation. A segmented marine worm Leocratides kimuraorum produces one of the loudest popping sounds in the ocean at 157 dB, frequencies 1–100 kHz, similar to the snapping shrimps. On the other side of the frequency spectrum are low frequency-vibrations, often not detected by hearing organs, but with other, less specialized sense organs. The examples include ground vibrations produced by elephants whose principal frequency component is around 15 Hz, and low- to medium-frequency substrate-borne vibrations used by most insect orders. Many animal sounds, however, do fall within the frequency range detectable by a human ear, between 20 and 20,000 Hz. Mechanisms for sound production and detection are just as diverse as the signals themselves.

Plant sounds
In a series of scientific journal articles published between 2013 and 2016, Dr Monica Gagliano of the University of Western Australia extended the science to include plant bioacoustics.

See also

 Acoustic ecology
 Acoustical oceanography
 Animal communication
 Animal language
 Anthropophony
 Biomusic
 Biophony
 Diffusion (acoustics)
 Field recording
 Frog hearing and communication
 List of animal sounds
 List of Bioacoustics Software
 Music therapy
 Natural sounds
 Soundscape ecology
 Underwater acoustics
 Vocal learning
 Whale sound
 Zoomusicology

References

Further reading
 Ewing A.W. (1989): Arthropod bioacoustics: Neurobiology and behaviour. Edinburgh: Edinburgh University Press. 
 Fletcher N. (2007): Animal Bioacoustics. IN: Rossing T.D. (ed.): Springer Handbook of Acoustics, Springer.

External links

ASA Animal Bioacoustics Technical Committee
BioAcoustica: Wildlife Sounds Database
 The British Library Sound Archive has 150,000 recordings of over 10,000 species.
 International Bioacoustics Council links to many bioacoustics resources.
 Borror Laboratory of Bioacoustics at The Ohio State University has a large archive of animal sound recordings.
 Listen to Nature 400 examples of animal songs and calls
 Wildlife Sound Recording Society
 Bioacoustic Research Program at the Cornell Lab of Ornithology distributes a number of different free bioacoustics synthesis & analysis programs.
 Macaulay Library at the Cornell Lab of Ornithology is the world's largest collection of animal sounds and associated video.
 Xeno-canto A collection of bird vocalizations from around the world.

Acoustics
Zoosemiotics
Soundscape ecology
Sound
Noise
Hearing